Goryo Dam  is a rockfill dam located in Hokkaido Prefecture in Japan. The dam is used for irrigation. The catchment area of the dam is 45.9 km2. The dam impounds about 83  ha of land when full and can store 5780 thousand cubic meters of water. The construction of the dam was completed in 1986.

References

Dams in Hokkaido